Clemens Bollen (born 12 February 1948 in Langholt, Leer) is a German politician and member of the SPD.

Early life 
After graduating from secondary school in 1965, Bollen trained as an industrial clerk until 1968. He then worked as an employee in human resources at the Olympia-Werke in Leer until 1979. There he was also deputy chairman of the works council and a member of the central works council. Bollen was the first authorized representative of IG Metall Leer/Papenburg since 1980.

External links
 Official website 

1948 births
Living people
People from Leer (district)
University of Oldenburg alumni
Members of the Bundestag for Lower Saxony
Members of the Bundestag 2005–2009
Members of the Bundestag for the Social Democratic Party of Germany
German trade unionists
Works councillors